The Orange–Fish Tunnel is a  long irrigation tunnel in central South Africa, built to divert water from the Orange River to the Fish River valley. It is the longest continuous enclosed aqueduct in the southern hemisphere.

Purpose 
For many years, large areas in the Eastern Cape experienced severe water shortages because of little rainfall in the arid Karoo. The situation was aggravated by the reduction in capacity of many of the existing dams due to heavy silt deposits.

The Project to alleviate this situation comprised two inter-dependent engineering schemes - neither of which was any use without the other.  First, a dam had to be built across the Orange River; and then a tunnel had to be driven to take the water across the water-shed into a further river system.  The Orange-Fish Tunnel, together with its network of canals, weirs and balancing dams, has enabled these areas to be restored and has made the irrigation of thousands of hectares of additional land possible. The main purpose of the tunnel is to divert water from the Gariep Dam to the Eastern Cape Karoo for irrigation, household and industrial use.

Route
The tunnel diverts water from the Orange River to the Great Fish River and the semi-arid areas of Eastern Cape province.  The Orange River is the largest river in South Africa by volume, and the longest. It rises in the Drakensberg Mountains of Lesotho and flows Westwards through increasingly drier country to discharge into the South Atlantic at Oranjemund, where, through evaporation and abstraction, the volume was far less than it was at the location of the Gariep Dam.

The inlet tower at  takes water from the Gariep Dam at Oviston: the name Oviston is an acronym based on the Afrikaans Oranje-VISrivier TONnel. After traversing due South under the Suurberg mountain plateau, it releases the water to the Teebus Spruit (tunnel outlet at ), to the Groot Brak River and onwards to the valleys of the Great Fish River and the Sundays River.

The tunnel is on what is called a "self-cleansing" gradient of 2% from North to South.  During construction, South Africa changed over from "Imperial" measurement to the metric system, but special dispensation was made for this Project to use Imperial measure throughout, which was half-built at the time.

Construction 
Construction started in 1966; preliminary works included a tarred road running parallel to the route of the tunnel, and three towns, Oviston at the North end, one in the one middle called "Mid-shaft", and "Teebus" at the South end.   These towns included such facilities as a Clubhouse, tennis courts, a community hall, primary school, clinic, etc..  At Oviston there was also a power station to provide electricity to the tunnels and to the towns.  Other facilities included contractor's yards, a testing laboratory, and offices for the staff.

The tunnel is 19'-6" in finished diameter, with a 9" thick mass concrete lining.  The ground was excavated entirely by the drill-and-blast technique, and was tested both by flood and by fire.

The lining was done using a travelling shutter - concrete arrived first thing Monday morning, and continued unstopped until Saturday afternoon.  The concrete mix was specially developed for the project, and the "cement" content was 50% Slagment a.k.a. PFA (Pulverised Fuel Ash). The mix contained retarders to enable the concrete to be placed up to six hours after mixing, and it also contained accelerators, to enable the shutter to be moved after only eighteen hours. The speed of the shutter was about  a week.

It is on a gradient of 1:2000.

It was engineered by the British firm of Consulting Engineers, Sir William Halcrow & Partners, in association with Messrs Keeve Steyn and Partners of Johannesburg. The Client was the South African Department of Water Affairs. Halcrow's senior partner, Sir Alan Muir-Wood, sometimes known as "the father of modern tunneling", worked on many of the world's leading tunnel projects, including the Orange-Fish Tunnel; the senior Engineer in charge of the design & supervision was Barry Kidd, who died young, before construction was completed.

The tunnel was opened in 1975. Over 200 000 m3 of concrete was used to line the tunnel which has a maximum throughput of 54 m3/s (about 2,000 cusecs).

Intake at Oviston
Seen from above, the intake tower is shaped like a four-leaf clover with each leaf containing an inlet gate - all at different levels. In this manner, water can be drawn from different levels to help control the water quality. Each of the four inlets can be sealed off to allow complete de-watering of the tunnel for routine maintenance.

References

External links
 Panoramio Photo of the tunnel inlet

Orange River
Great Fish River
Water tunnels
Tunnels in South Africa
Tunnels completed in 1975
Interbasin transfer

af:Oranjerivierprojek#Oranje-Vistonnel